Hard Time is a 1998 American made-for-television action crime film directed by and starring Burt Reynolds. This film premiered on TNT on December 13, 1998.

It is followed by two sequels, The Premonition and Hostage Hotel (both in 1999). It was always envisioned as a trilogy.

Plot
Logan McQueen, a Vietnam War veteran and Miami police officer, chases two briefcase thieves down an alley. One of the thieves knocks him down steals his gun, and shoots the other thief with it. Logan is put in prison pending investigation but his bail is provided by the mob, who expect him to return money that is missing from the stolen briefcase. Logan begins to suspect that someone in his own police department is framing him for the crimes but the mob has now given him an opportunity to seek the truth.

Cast 
 Burt Reynolds as Detective Logan McQueen
 Charles Durning as Detective Charlie Duffy
 Robert Loggia as Connie Martin
 Mia Sara as Myler
 Billy Dee Williams as Leo Barker
 Paco Christian Prieto as Catarato Estevez
 John D'Aquino as Ray Hertz
 Roddy Piper as Randy
 Buck Taylor as Captain Adam Gunther
 Ja'net Dubois as 'Lefty' 
 Michael Buie as Higgs
 Jack Sheldon as Trumpet
 Grace Una as Nguyen 
 Gene LeBell as Eddie
 Clint Lilley as 'Chu-Chu'
 Danny Arroyo as Pepe

Production
Reynolds made the film after the triumph of Boogie Nights. He later said: "After the excitement or resurrection or finding out that I wasn't dead came out, I promised myself two things. One was that I wanted to do a major studio film (Mystery, Alaska), and the other one was that I wanted to direct - because I had a great passion for directing, and I missed it".

TNT approached Reynolds with the offer to star in three TV movies, one of which he would direct: "This was a chance to do something that the Turner network had never done before, which was to take a few characters and put them in three movies, all of which could stand on their own but do them in a way that there would be an arc to the characters. They would change in the three films".

The films were all set in Florida but shot in Los Angeles because it was cheaper. Reynolds said that "this is a film with three Oscar nominees. We had access to a lot of people who don't ordinarily do television. . . . If we had to take them to Miami, our budget would go up greatly. So that would have to be taken into account".

Reynolds said he liked the film because he liked the idea of watching someone who had strong views on capital punishment change his mind. Reynolds said the character was like his father, "one of the fairest men I've ever known, but he is prejudiced about things, and that's because he spent his whole life as a policeman. He's not real good about forgiveness when someone does something illegal".

Reynolds changed his character's name from Conrad Logan (as it was originally written) to Logan McQueen as a nod to the "very complicated, very underrated" Steve McQueen.

Reynolds enjoyed directing: "It's the difference between being a chess player and chess pawn. Having done 300 television shows and almost 60 movies, I'm tired of having guys who are younger than some sandwiches I've had telling me to turn left at the couch. There's no appreciation of actors and no sense of history".

Home media
The film was released on DVD on August 3, 2004.

Hard Time: The Premonition
Hard Time: The Premonition is a 1999 sequel to Hard Time.

Plot
A serial bomber terrorizes the city.

Cast
 Burt Reynolds as Detective Logan McQueen
 Charles Durning as Detective Charlie Duffy
 Bruce Dern as Winston
 Gigi Rice as Janice
 Michael Buie as Higgs
 Roscoe Lee Browne as Sebastian
 Michael DeLuise as Dee
 Richard Riehle as Captain Waters
 Pepper Sweeney as Haflin
 Paul Bartel as Proprietor

Hard Time: Hostage Hotel
Hard Time: Hostage Hotel is a 1999 American film. It is the third and last in the Hard Time series. It was also known as Hide and Seek. It was the last film to be directed by Hal Needham before his death in 2013.

Plot
Though they have not yet made up with each other, Duffy convinces Logan to help him catch fugitive Sy Harkin. The rescue goes wrong, ending in a gunfight and leaving Flynn and Duffy seeking another paying job.

As Congressman Robert Sinclair is giving a speech in the ballroom of an old hotel that is being renovated, his wife Susan and daughter Justine are taken hostage by Vietnam vets Flynn and Kenny, who blows up the ballroom and kills the audience, though Sinclair escapes. Flynn demands to negotiate through Duffy, who helped him out of jail in the past.

The FBI attempt to rescue Sinclair's family but are killed by various booby traps in the hotel. Duffy safely follows instructions from Flynn to the meeting point but is knocked out when Flynn discovers that he is wearing a wire. Logan arrives to see Susan's aide thrown to her death from a hotel window. Higgs obtains weapons and he and Logan infiltrate the hotel through a basement window, but are overheard by the FBI and the criminals as they are communicating with Captain Waters on a walkie-talkie channel.

Logan breaks into the room as Flynn is about to throw Justine out the window. Duffy shoots Kenny and Logan chases Flynn through the tunnels under the hotel, navigating a series of booby traps marked in Vietnamese. Logan offers to get Flynn help for his trauma from war but Flynn refuses and blows himself up, though Logan manages to dive and save himself and Justine.

Cast
 Burt Reynolds as Logan McQueen
 Charles Durning as Duffy
 Keith Carradine as Flynn
 Kevin Durand as Kenny, Flynn's Henchman
 Michael Buie as Higgs
 David Rasche as Robert Sinclair
 Ted McGinley as Agent Hopkins
 Elizabeth Dennehy as Susan Sinclair
 Richard Riehle as Captain Waters
 Danielle Harris as Justine Sinclair
 Debra Christofferson as Ricki Stewart, Susan's Aide

References

External links 
 
 Hostage Hotel at IMDb
 Hostage Hotel at TCMDB
 Hard Time review at Variety
 Hard Time review at Los Angeles Times

1998 television films
1998 films
1990s crime films
American crime films
Films about veterans
Films directed by Burt Reynolds
Films directed by David S. Cass Sr.
Films directed by Hal Needham
Films set in Miami
Larry Levinson Productions
TNT Network original films
1990s American films